Perazzoli is an Italian surname. Notable people with the surname include:

Ettore Perazzoli (1974–2003), Italian free software developer
Lou Perazzoli, American computer scientist

Italian-language surnames